Sandor Gombay (22 October 1938 – 12 January 2015) was a Swiss fencer. He competed in the individual and team sabre events at the 1972 Summer Olympics.

References

1938 births
2015 deaths
Swiss male fencers
Olympic fencers of Switzerland
Fencers at the 1972 Summer Olympics
Swiss people of Hungarian descent